WFSH may refer to:
Current stations:
 WFSH-FM, a radio station (104.7 FM) licensed to Athens, Georgia, United States
Former stations:
 WFSH (AM), a former station (1340 AM) licensed to Valparaiso-Niceville, Florida, United States